The Kılıç class is one of the fast attack craft / missile boat classes of the Turkish Navy. It is defined as a corvette by Lürssen Werft, the German designer of the vessel.

The ship has a specially developed superstructure and mast for low radar cross-section.

The first batch of three ships are designated Kılıç I and the second batch of six ships are designated Kılıç II. 

P-330 Kılıç was built in Germany, the other ships of the class were built in Turkey.

See also
List of Turkish Navy ships

External links
 Official Turkish Navy site
 Turkish Navy Kılıç class patrol craft

Missile boat classes
Missile boats of the Turkish Navy
Corvettes of the Turkish Navy